Thomas Atkinson (6 July 1822 – 15 October 1906) was a pioneer farmer in the Willunga, South Australia and for nine years was a representative for that district in Parliament. In later life he was frequently referred to as "Captain Atkinson".

History
Thomas Atkinson was the fourth son of Robert Anderson, a farmer of Snitterby, Lincolnshire. His parents died when he was nine years old, and his oldest brother William for a while managed the farm but, suffering ill health and seeking a warmer climate, decided they should emigrate, so sold up and on 12 November 1839 arrived at Holdfast Bay on the barque Singapore under Captain Hamilton, with three experienced farmers as future employees.

At first they settled in Kangarilla, but found the land at Willunga more fertile and moved again, founding a mixed farm while breeding sheep, dairy cattle and bullocks. At first the going was hard; their first livestock were expensive (the first 40 head of cattle which they purchased cost them from £16 to £20 each, and their horses from £65 to £95 per head), then recession hit and their progeny were virtually worthless and they were producing more butter than the market could bear, but then copper was found at Burra, and bullocks were in high demand so the brothers prospered. They dissolved their partnership and Thomas, who had received some instruction in architecture and bricklaying in England, built the Bush Inn at Willunga in 1840, and purchased Ashley Farm, where he and his wife (a daughter of Stephen Bastian) lived the rest of their lives.

Thomas was a good farmer, an early adopter of improved farming techniques; he was one of the first to employ seed drills and manure drills, and paid attention to scientific breeding of his cattle. The only time he exhibited in the Adelaide Show he won first prize for his Durham bull. He was also keen on thoroughbred racing, but though he employed a jockey and trainer, his only real successes were in country meetings. He was a longtime member of the Royal Agricultural and Horticultural Society of South Australia and for many years a committee member. He was a fine judge of horses and cattle and was employed in that capacity in most of the Shows throughout South Australia until 1898, when at 76 years of age he resigned from all his commitments.

He was one of South Australia's first Justices of the Peace, and was also appointed one of the first Road Commissioners (a predecessor of district councils) during Sir Henry Young's time, then was a member of the Willunga District Council for 28 years. He was a commissioner for the Sydney and Melbourne exhibitions, and for many years a member of the School Board of Advice. In 1860 he was appointed captain of the Willunga Rifle Volunteer Force, and in 1895 honorary captain of the Mounted Volunteer Force (both militias of the Colony in the years before Federation). He took Sir John Colton's place in Parliament as member for Noarlunga in September 1878, and continued as a member until 1887,  when Dashwood beat him by 13 votes. Though an able raconteur, he was not fond of public speaking and was referred to in Parliament as the "silent member".

Family
Thomas's brothers who migrated to South Australia were: William (1814 – November 1840); Robert (1820 – 8 June 1862); Joseph (1824 – 25 September 1878). All died at Willunga. A sister Susanna (1828 – 31 May 1894) also made the trip and married James Holman (ca. 1827 – 1 May 1903) on 9 September 1852; they lived at Napperby, near Port Pirie.

Atkinson married Jane Bastian (1 April 1824 – 24 July 1910) on 20 May 1847.

Both died at "Ashley Farm" and were buried in St. Stephen's (Anglican) cemetery, Willunga.

Their adopted son, Thomas Arthur Palmer, was born in 1868 and died on 7 March 1885. They had no other children.

References 

1822 births
1906 deaths
Members of the South Australian House of Assembly
People from Willunga, South Australia
19th-century Australian politicians
English emigrants to colonial Australia